Vincenzo Auricchio (1 May 1916 – 12 July 1970) was an Italian racing driver who won the 1947 Italian Championship (Coppa Acerbo).

He was born in 1916, just outside of Naples in San Giuseppe Vesuviano. His parents were of the Auricchio cheese manufacturing family that had started in this town, relocating to Cremona in northern Italy in the 1930s.  His uncle Gennaro Auricchio (1914–2007) was also into car racing for Alfa Romeo.

After the end of World War II, Vincenzo debuted and won the 1947 Coppa Acerbo in a Stanguellini-Fiat 1100 car.  Until his retirement in 1957, he took part in eight of the Mille Miglias, the best in 1949 when he came in fourth with Piero Bozzini.

He died in a sports boating accident on Lake Como in 1970.

References

1916 births
1970 deaths
Italian racing drivers
Mille Miglia drivers
Racing drivers from Naples
Accidental deaths in Italy